This article lists rankings of semiconductor equipment suppliers by sales (in US-Dollar).

Definition 
An IC equipment supplier's revenue is classified as sales of systems used to manufacture semiconductors, thin-film heads, MEMS, and integrated circuits, as well as service, support, and retrofitted systems (flat panel displays are not included).

Sources 
A number of industry sources of data exist. Former VLSI Research, which is now part of TechInsights, provide yearly (priced) data insights.

Sales Rankings (Years)

2021 
COVID-19 impacted the supply chain of equipment manufacturers. However, ASML and Applied Materials "jumped" above the $20B and Lam Research and TEL cleared the $16B mark.

2017 
Source: Unknown (likely: VLSI Research)

2016 
Source : VLSI Research Inc supplied rankings for 2016

2013
Source : Gartner, Inc. supplied rankings for 2013
<div align="left">

2011 
Source : VLSI Research Inc supplied rankings for 2011
<div align="left">

2009
Source : VLSI Research Inc supplied rankings for 2009

2008
Source : VLSI Research Inc supplied rankings for 2008

2007
Source : VLSI Research Inc supplied rankings for 2007

2006
Source : VLSI Research Inc supplied rankings for 2006

Additional information 
 (1) Agilent Technologies spun off their semiconductor test business to Verigy in June 2006.Verigy's total revenues for 2006 also included part of semiconductor testing from Agilent Technologies for the first half of 2006.

Secondary semiconductor equipment providers 

In addition to the market leaders listed above, there is a large market for used or secondary semiconductor equipment. A number of companies provide secondary semiconductor equipment and/or refurbish semiconductor tools. For example, RED Equipment ($50M+ sales in 2011) provides secondary semiconductor equipment, parts and services including equipment remarketing, de-installation, relocation, refurbishment, and installation. Whereas other companies provide some of these services or services for particular tool sets, RED Equipment is unique in that it works on a turnkey 'project process', providing the full range of services for virtually all 200mm tool sets.

See also
SEMI
Semiconductor foundry sales leaders by year
Semiconductor fabless sales leaders by year
Semiconductor device fabrication
Semiconductor industry
Transistor count

References

 
Lists of companies by revenue
Lists of manufacturers